Esther Dale (November 10, 1885 – July 23, 1961) was an American actress of the stage and screen.

Early years
Dale was born in Beaufort, South Carolina. She attended Leland and Gray Seminary in Townshend, Vermont. In Berlin, Germany, she studied music and enjoyed a successful career as a singer of lieder on the concert stage. Her singing career included appearances with the New York Philharmonic and the Boston Symphony Orchestra.

At one point, Dale was head of Smith College's vocal department.

Stage 
In America, Dale transferred to the acting stage and cultivated a career as an actress in Summer stock. She starred in Carrie Nation on Broadway in 1933. Her other Broadway credits include Harvest of Years (1947), And Be My Love (1944), and Another Language (1932).

Film 
Dale's first film was Crime Without Passion (1934) in an uncredited role. She played Birdie Hicks in the Ma and Pa Kettle films The Egg and I (1947), Ma and Pa Kettle (1949), Ma and Pa Kettle at the Fair (1952), and Ma and Pa Kettle at Waikiki (1955).

Television 
Dale played many roles in television over the years.

In 1957, she appeared in the 1957 Maverick episode "According to Hoyle" opposite James Garner.  That same year, she guest-starred in the TV Western series Wagon Train, playing Grandma Birch, in the episode “The Julie Gage Story”.

In the 1958-1959 season of The Donna Reed Show, Dale played a job-seeking housekeeper who is frightened from the Stone home by Jeff Stone's pet mouse.

Death 
Dale died in the summer of 1961 following surgery in Queen of Angels Hospital in Hollywood. Her husband, writer-director Arthur J. Beckhard, had died four months earlier.

Partial filmography

 Crime Without Passion (1934) as Miss Keeley (uncredited)
 The Wedding Night (1935) as Mrs. Kaise Novak
 Private Worlds (1935) as Matron
 Curly Top (1935) as Aunt Genevieve Graham
 I Live My Life (1935) as Brumbaugh, Mrs. Gage's Housekeeper
 Mary Burns, Fugitive (1935) as Kate
 In Old Kentucky (1935) as Dolly Breckenridge
 I Dream Too Much (1935) as Mrs. Dilley (uncredited)
 The Great Impersonation (1935) as Mrs. Unthank
 Timothy's Quest (1936) as Hitty Tarbox
 Lady of Secrets (1936) as Miss Eccles
 The Farmer in the Dell (1936) as Louella 'Ma' Boyer
 The Case Against Mrs. Ames (1936) as Matilda
 Fury (1936) as Mrs. Whipple
 Hollywood Boulevard (1936) as Martha
 The Magnificent Brute (1936) as Mrs. Randolph (uncredited)
 Outcast (1937) as Hattie Simmerson
 Damaged Goods (1937) as Mrs. Dupont
 Easy Living (1937) as Lillian
 Wild Money (1937) as Jenny Hawkins
 Dead End (1937) as Mrs. Fenner
 On Such a Night (1937) as Miss Belinda Fentridge
 The Awful Truth (1937) as Mrs. Leeson
 Of Human Hearts (1938) as Mrs. Cantwell (uncredited)
 Condemned Women (1938) as Mrs. Clara Glover, Head Matron
 Stolen Heaven (1938) as Lieschen
 Prison Farm (1938) as Cora Waxley
 Girls on Probation (1938) as Nrs, Engstrom (uncredited)
 Dramatic School (1938) as Forewoman in Factory (uncredited)
 The Great Man Votes (1939) as Ms. Markham (uncredited)
 Made for Each Other (1939) as Annie, Cook #1 (uncredited)
 Sergeant Madden (1939) as Mrs. McGillivray (uncredited)
 Broadway Serenade (1939) as Mrs. Olsen
 Big Town Czar (1939) as Ma Daley
 Tell No Tales (1939) as Mrs. Haskins
 6,000 Enemies (1939) as Matron
 The Women (1939) as Ingrid (uncredited)
 Blackmail (1939) as Sarah
 Bad Little Angel (1939) as Miss Brown, Orphanage Secretary (uncredited)
 A Child Is Born (1939) as Prison Matron (uncredited)
 Swanee River (1939) as Temperance Woman
 Laddie (1940) as Sarah, the Housekeeper
 Abe Lincoln in Illinois (1940) as Lincoln's Cook (uncredited)
 Village Barn Dance (1940) as Minerva Withers
 Convicted Woman (1940) as Chief Matron Brackett
 Women Without Names (1940) as Head Matron Ingles
 And One Was Beautiful (1940) as Margaret
 Forty Little Mothers (1940) as Mrs. Mason, Landlady (uncredited)
 Opened by Mistake (1940) as Mrs. Anthony DeBorest
 The Mortal Storm (1940) as Marta
 Untamed (1940) as Mrs. Smith
 Cross-Country Romance (1940) as Mrs. McGillicuddy (uncredited)
 Blondie Has Servant Trouble (1940) as Anna Vaughn
 Arise, My Love (1940) as Susie
 Mr. & Mrs. Smith (1941) as Mrs. Krausheimer
 Back Street (1941) as Mrs. Smith
 The Hard-Boiled Canary (1941) as Miss Clark
 Unfinished Business (1941) as Aunt Mathilda
 Aloma of the South Seas (1941) as Tarusa
 All-American Co-Ed (1941) as Aunt Matilda Collinge
 Dangerously They Live (1941) as Dawson
 Blondie Goes to College (1942) as Mrs. Carrie Dill, the Landlady (uncredited)
 What's Cookin'? (1942) as Mrs. Murphy (uncredited)
 You're Asking Me (1942) as Aunt Fannie Handley
 Ten Gentlemen from West Point (1942) as Mrs. Thompson
 Maisie Gets Her Man (1942) as Mrs. Myra McIntyre, Elsie's Mother (uncredited)
 I Married an Angel (1942) as Mrs. Gherkin (uncredited)
 Wrecking Crew (1942) as Mike O'Glendy
 The Amazing Mrs. Holliday (1943) as Lucy
 Hello, Frisco, Hello (1943) as Aunt Harriet (uncredited)
 Murder in Times Square (1943) as Longacre Lil
 Swing Your Partner (1943) as Caroline Bird, aka Anna Robbins
 The North Star (1943) as Anna Kurin
 Old Acquaintance (1943) as Harriet
 Out of This World (1945) as Abbie Pringle (uncredited)
 Bedside Manner (1945) as Martha Gravitt
 On Stage Everybody (1945) as Ma Cassidy
 Behind City Lights (1945) as Sarah Lowell
 My Reputation (1946) as Anna
 A Stolen Life (1946) as Mrs. Johnson
 Smoky (1946) as Mrs. 'Gram' Richards
 Margie (1946) as Grandma McSweeney
 The Egg and I (1947) as Birdie Hicks
 The Unfinished Dance (1947) as Olga
 A Song Is Born (1948) as Miss Bragg
 Ma and Pa Kettle (1949) as Mrs. Birdie Hicks
 Anna Lucasta (1949) as Mrs. Polaski (uncredited)
 Holiday Affair (1949) as Mrs. Ennis
 No Man of Her Own (1950) as Josie
 Surrender (1950) as Aunt May
 Walk Softly, Stranger (1950) as Miss Thompson
 On Moonlight Bay (1951) as Aunt Martha Robertson (uncredited)
 Too Young to Kiss (1951) as Mrs. Boykin
 Ma and Pa Kettle at the Fair (1952) as Birdie Hicks
 Monkey Business (1952) as Mrs. Rhinelander
 Ma and Pa Kettle at Waikiki (1955) as Birdie Hicks
 Betrayed Women (1955) as Head Matron Ballard
 The Oklahoman (1957) as Mrs. Fitzgerald
 The Sound and the Fury (1959) as Mrs. Maud Mansfield (uncredited)
 North to Alaska (1960) as Woman at Picnic (uncredited)

References

External links

1885 births
1961 deaths
American film actresses
American stage actresses
20th-century American actresses
Actresses from South Carolina
People from Beaufort, South Carolina
Smith College faculty
American women academics